The 1994 Utah State Aggies football team represented Utah State University in the 1994 NCAA Division I-A football season. The Aggies were led by head coach Charlie Weatherbie in his third and final year at Utah State. The Aggies played their home games at Romney Stadium in Logan, Utah, their 27th season in the venue. Despite having made a bowl game and sharing the Big West Conference championship the year prior, the Aggies suffered through a difficult year, finishing 3–8 overall and 2–4 in Big West play.

Schedule

References

Utah State
Utah State Aggies football seasons
Utah State Aggies football